Twisted gastrulation protein homolog 1 is a protein that in humans is encoded by the TWSG1 gene. The protein is a binding protein for bone morphogenetic proteins, similar to Chordin. The Twisted gastrulation gene is expressed in the extraembryonic tissues during organogenesis, and in certain adult tissues such as the lymph nodes, kidneys, liver, and lungs.

References

Further reading

Developmental genes and proteins